Magnolia garrettii is a species of plant in the family Magnoliaceae. It is found in northern Thailand, northern Vietnam, and Yunnan, China.

Names
In Thailand, it is known as montha pa, or the "forest montha."

The scientific name of the plant is named after H.B.G. Garrett (1899-1959), who discovered it in Chiang Mai Province, Thailand.

Distribution and ecology
Magnolia garrettii is a partly deciduous tree distributed in scattered areas across southwestern China, Vietnam, and Thailand. In Thailand, it is found in the northern provinces of Chiang Mai, Chiang Rai, Mae Hong Son, Tak, Nan, and Phitsanulok. It is found in hill evergreen forests at 1,000–1,850 metres asl and is locally common in Doi Suthep and Doi Inthanon.

The fruit is ovoid and 4-8 cm.

Description
Magnolia garrettii flowers from April to May. Fruiting occurs from June to October. The fruit produces red seeds.

It grows up to 25 metres tall.

References

garrettii
Flora of Thailand
Flora of Vietnam
Flora of China
Taxa named by William Grant Craib